This is a list of some of the major foes of the Marvel Comics superhero team, the X-Men.

Central rogues' gallery

Other recurring antagonists

Teams

See also
 List of X-Men members

References

Enemies
Lists of Marvel Comics supervillains
Lists of Marvel Comics characters by organization
X-Men enemies, List of
Marvel Comics supervillain teams